"Heaven Can Wait" is the first single by Charlotte Gainsbourg from her album IRM.  The song prominently features Beck, who wrote the song and produced IRM, on backing vocals. It was chosen as the iTunes Pick of the Week on March 2, 2010.

Music video

Synopsis
The music video for "Heaven Can Wait" was directed by Keith Schofield.  Various scenes are featured as Charlotte Gainsbourg and Beck sing: a dinosaur in a wig (in a bathtub), a giant rat getting held up at knife point, a man in a SpongeBob costume getting tackled by the police, an astronaut with pancakes for a head, a man racing a flying axe, and another man with half a beard.

Reception
The music video for "Heaven Can Wait" was included on Pitchfork Media's Top Music Videos of 2009. It was also placed at #16 on the "Top 20 Best Music Videos of 2009" by SPIN.

Track listing
UK CD single
 "Heaven Can Wait" – 2:42
 "Heaven Can Wait (Chris Taylor Of Grizzly Bear Remix)" – 2:15
 "Heaven Can Wait (Nosaj Thing Remix)	" – 3:17
 "Heaven Can Wait (Jackson Escalator Remix)" – 7:05

Awards

Charts

References

2009 singles
Charlotte Gainsbourg songs
Beck songs
Songs written by Beck
Male–female vocal duets
2009 songs